was a Japanese kugyō (court noble) of the late Kamakura period. He was the son of regent Nijō Kanemoto.

Michihira held the position of kampaku (chief advisor to the emperor) from 1316–1318 and from 1327–1330.

References
 

1288 births
1335 deaths
Fujiwara clan
Michihira